Rohan Nichol (born 4 July 1976) is an Australian television and film actor. His roles include Raymus Antilles in Star Wars: Episode III – Revenge of the Sith, Aaron Collingwood in All Saints, and Detective Luc Palermo in headLand. From June 2017, he began playing Ben Astoni in the television soap opera Home and Away.

Early and personal life
Nichol was born and raised in Geraldton. He attended the Western Australian Academy of Performing Arts (WAAPA).

Career
Nichol played Captain Raymus Antilles in Star Wars: Episode III – Revenge of the Sith (2005). He initially thought he would be portraying Wedge Antilles, but when he arrived on the set in Sydney, he learned that he would actually play the part of Raymus, originally played by Peter Geddis in Star Wars Episode IV: A New Hope.

Nichol has also appeared in Fool's Gold, alongside Kate Hudson and Matthew McConaughey, and the 2011 film Red Dog, alongside his Revenge of the Sith co-star Keisha Castle-Hughes. Nichol played Detective Luc Palermo in headLand, and appeared in several episodes of the TV series All Saints as Aaron Collingwood. Other television appearances include, A Place to Call Home and Reef Doctors.

Nichol joined the main cast of Home and Away as Ben Astoni in 2017. He had previously appeared in the serial in 2004 as Stafford McRae. Nichol relocated from Melbourne to Manly in New South Wales to be closer to the studio. Nichol also made an appearance in Pirates of the Caribbean: Dead Men Tell No Tales that same year. In July 2020, Nichol and co-star Kestie Morassi, who played Maggie Astoni, departed Home and Away. Nichol plays Griffo in the ABC Me drama series MaveriX, which began airing in April 2022.

Filmography

References

External links
 
 Beacon #164 - Captain Antilles Speaks!

1976 births
Living people
Australian male film actors
Australian male television actors
People from Geraldton
Male actors from Western Australia